"Cherchez La Femme" (French for Seek the woman) is a song that was written and performed by Dr. Buzzard's Original Savannah Band with lead vocals by Cory Daye in 1976. The music was written by band-leader and pianist Stony Browder Jr. and John Schonberger, Richard Coburn (né Frank Reginald DeLong; 1886–1952), and Vincent Rose; with lyrics by Browder Jr.'s brother and bassist August Darnell. The song's full title is "Whispering"/"Cherchez La Femme"/"Se Si Bon" [sic]. "Cherchez La Femme" became the group's biggest hit.

The song's opening lyric refers to record executive Tommy Mottola, who was instrumental in giving the act their major label deal. Along with the tracks "Sour and Sweet" and "I'll Play the Fool", "Cherchez La Femme" went to #1 on the disco chart. "Cherchez La Femme" also charted on the pop, R&B, and Adult Contemporary charts.

Track listing

 7" Single
 "Whispering" / "Cherchez La Femme" / "Se Si Bon" - 3:33
 "Sunshower" - 4:02

Charts

Weekly charts

Year-end charts

Gloria Estefan version

"Cherchez La Femme" was covered by Cuban American singer-songwriter Gloria Estefan on her fourth studio album, Hold Me, Thrill Me, Kiss Me. It was released as the fifth single from the album in the US, Australia and Benelux.

Critical reception
Pan-European magazine Music & Media commented, "In 1977, romantic couples took the floor every time Dr. Buzzard's Original Savannah Band was played. Now another "femme" is singing the nostalgic swing band song with equal joy." Phil Shanklin of ReviewsRevues wrote in his review of the Hold Me, Thrill Me, Kiss Me album, that it is "a brave move" to cover the song. He added, "Gloria’ s vocal lacks the playful coquettishness of Cory Daye’s but it is great to hear it again amongst her selections of songs."

Track listings

Official versions 

Original Versions
 Album Version — (4:58)

Pablo Flores & Jose "Pepe" Ojeda Remixes
 Radio Club Mix — (4:55)
 Alternative Radio Club Mix — (3:54)
 "Femme Fatale" Club Mix — (8:24)

Ronnie Ventura Remixes
 Piano Mix — (6:39)
 Doom Dub — (8:16)
 Ballroom Vocal Mix — (7:29)

Remixes
 The GStyle & DJ WT Mix — (8:16)
 The Gary Q Mix — (7:00)
 The Danny C. & Giuseppe G. Mix — (6:30)
 The Marc "DJ Stew" Pirrone Dub — (5:10)
 The Charley Casanova Mix — (5:38)

Charts

Popular culture
The original recording of "Cherchez La Femme" was part of the soundtrack to the 1998 film, 54.

Michael Tolliver, one of the main characters of Armistead Maupin’s ‘’Tales of the City,’’ dances to the song when he competes in the jockey shorts dance contest, which he wins.

"Cherchez La Ghost," the 1999 single by rapper Ghostface Killah which remixes "Cherchez La Femme" and charted on the Billboard 100.

See also
Cherchez la femme (saying)

References

1976 songs
1976 singles
1995 singles
RCA Records singles
Gloria Estefan songs
Disco songs
Franglais songs
Songs written by August Darnell